Los Ángeles is a corregimiento in Gualaca District, Chiriquí Province, Panama. Its population as of 1990 was 617; its population as of 2000 was 666.

References

Corregimientos of Chiriquí Province